Rob Morrison  is an American former television journalist and news anchor.

Career
Morrison began his broadcasting career as a combat correspondent while serving in the U.S. Marine Corps. He was a radio disc jockey and news anchor and reporter while stationed on Okinawa, Japan, in the early 1990s. As a civilian, Morrison began his career at WGMC-TV in Worcester, Massachusetts. He later worked at WWLP-TV in Springfield, Massachusetts, and in Hartford, Connecticut. As a foreign correspondent, he reported from Iraq and Qatar during the Second Gulf War; Afghanistan, where he embedded with the Marines during Operation Enduring Freedom in 2001; and Haiti.

In 1999, Morrison began a nine-year period at WNBC, the New York City, flagship station of the NBC television network. There he co-anchored Today in New York and Weekend Today in New York, the station's early-morning, local-news-and-entertainment television program.  n 2001, Morrison moved to the station's weekend-evening newscasts.

In 2004, he was made a co-anchor of the weekday edition of Today in New York, alongside Darlene Rodriguez, and stayed in that position until 2008 when he left the station. During Morrison's time with WNBC, he also served as a correspondent for NBC News, as well as a news reader for Weekend Today, also an early-morning, news-and-entertainment television program and a production of NBC News.

After leaving WNBC and NBC, Morrison wrote a blog, Daddy Diaries Confessions of a Stay-at-Home Anchorman, which was published on The Huffington Post, a news website and content-aggregating blog.
 
In 2009, he joined WCBS, a local broadcast-television station also located in New York City and the flagship station of the CBS broadcast-television network where Morrison has anchored the station's morning and evening weekend newscasts. On December 20, 2010, he was named co-anchor, with Mary Calvi, of the weekday editions of CBS 2 News This Morning, the station's early-morning news program, and on newscasts beginning January 3, 2011.

On February 20, 2013, Morrison resigned from his $300,000-a-year position at WCBS-TV.

Personal life
His wife, Ashley Morrison (née Risk), a business anchor for CBS MoneyWatch, was an anchor and reporter with Bloomberg Television from 2007 to 2009. In 2011, the couple and their son, Jack, moved from Manhattan to Darien, Connecticut.

Legal troubles

Domestic violence
In 2009, New York City police had arrested Morrison for allegedly assaulting his wife while the couple lived in Manhattan. Darien police had been called to their Connecticut home on October 17, 2011, arresting Morrison for disorderly conduct in an incident involving his wife, and responded to another domestic disturbance there on January 19, 2013.

Morrison was arrested in his home at approximately 1:30 a.m. Sunday, February 17, 2013, and charged with second-degree strangulation, second-degree threatening and disorderly conduct for allegedly choking his wife.  Judge Kenneth Povodator defined a protective order against him, forbidding contact with his wife and to remain 100 yards away from her.  On July 3, 2013, Morrison pleaded guilty to threatening and breach of peace charges and the strangulation charge was dropped in April 2014.

Harassment call charges
Morrison was arrested again on Monday, June 17, 2014, after calling his wife Ashley Morrison more than 100 times over several days the previous month. He was charged with criminal violation of a protection order and second-degree harassment after turning himself in on a warrant about 6PM. He later pleaded guilty to harassment charges against his wife Ashley in October 2014 and he was sentenced to six months probation.

See also

 Lists of journalists
 List of people from Connecticut
 List of people from Massachusetts
 List of people from New York City
 List of television reporters
 Media in New York City

References

External links
 

Place of birth missing (living people)
20th-century American non-fiction writers
21st-century American non-fiction writers
American bloggers
American radio DJs
American war correspondents
Living people
NBC News people
Television anchors from New York City
People from Darien, Connecticut
Writers from Hartford, Connecticut
People from Okinawa Prefecture
People from Springfield, Massachusetts
People from Worcester, Massachusetts
United States Marines
Writers from Massachusetts
Writers from New York City
Year of birth missing (living people)